iOS is a mobile operating system developed by Apple Inc.

IOS or ios may also refer to:

Technology
 Instructor operating station, in flight simulators
 International operator services, making an international call via a live telephone operator

Computing
 Cisco IOS, router and switch operating system
 Cisco IOS XE
 Cisco IOS XR
 ios (C++), a C++ header file ("input/output stream")
 I/O System (86-DOS), DOS BIOS in 86-DOS
 I/O System (MS-DOS), DOS BIOS in MS-DOS
 Input/Output Supervisor, a part of the control program in the IBM mainframe OS/360 operating system and its successors
 IOS (Wii firmware), firmware that runs on the Nintendo Wii used with Wii homebrew
 Internet operating system, any operating system designed to run all of its applications and services through an Internet client, generally a web browser
 Interorganizational system, a system between organization
 iOS, the operating system by Apple Inc for the iPhone and other mobile hardware

Organizations
 Illinois Ornithological Society, American state-based bird club
 Institute for Objectivist Studies, the former name of The Atlas Society
 Institute of Oriental Studies of the Russian Academy of Sciences
 International Organizations for Succulent Plant Research, in Zürich, Switzerland
 Interorbital Systems, an aerospace design firm in Mojave, California, US
 Investors Overseas Service, an investment company

Places
 Ios, a Greek island

 Ilhéus Jorge Amado Airport (IATA airport code), Ilhéus, Brazil

Media
 IOS Press, a Dutch scientific and medical publisher
 Independent on Sunday, a UK newspaper
 Ireland on Sunday, an Irish newspaper published from 1996 to 2006

Other uses
 International Open Series, an amateur snooker tour

See also
 eyeOS
 I/O System (disambiguation)
 IO (disambiguation)
 Input/Output Control System (IOCS)
 BIOS (disambiguation)
 XIOS, Extended Input/Output System